Roger Lewis Baker (born August 10, 1946) is an American former handball player who competed in the 1972 Summer Olympics and in the 1976 Summer Olympics.

He was born in Hood River, Oregon.

In 1972 he was part of the American team which finished 14th in the Olympic tournament. He played all five matches and scored eleven goals.

Four years later he finished tenth with the American team in the 1976 Olympic tournament. He played all five matches and scored ten goals again.

External links
 profile

1946 births
Living people
American male handball players
Olympic handball players of the United States
Handball players at the 1972 Summer Olympics
Handball players at the 1976 Summer Olympics
People from Hood River, Oregon